Hugh Mosman (11 February 1843 – 15 November 1909) was a mine owner and politician in Queensland, Australia. He discovered gold in Charters Towers. He was a Member of the Queensland Legislative Council.

Early life
Mosman was born on 11 February 1843 in Mosman, New South Wales. Merchant Archibald Mosman (1799–1863) was his father, and his mother was Harriet née Farquharson Hugh received his education at The King's School in North Parramatta, New South Wales.

Mosman initially aspired to be a pastoralist, but failed to establish a successful career and was left broke. He visited Queensland in 1860, hoping to acquire properties there; this was also unsuccessful. Mosman decided then to try his hand at prospecting. He spent the next ten years mining, and in 1870 he revisited Queensland, choosing to work in Ravenswood.

Gold
On 24 December 1871, Mosman was travelling with miners George Clark, James Fraser, and his servant, Jupiter Mosman, attempting to locate missing horses. After he found them, Jupiter located some shining gold nestled in a creek. Mosman named the place where the gold had been located Charters Towers (Charters Tors) after the gold mining warden W. S. E. M. Charters. After Jupiter's discovery was reported in January 1872, Ravenswood's population blossomed to around 30,000 people. The discovery prompted a gold rush in north of Queensland.

Mosman's life was largely simple from that point forward. In 1882, Mosman's left forearm was blown off by dynamite, which had exploded earlier than it was supposed to. Mosman remained generally reclusive up until June 1891, when he became a member of the Queensland Legislative Council. He did not give many speeches, and they were noted as being "conservative and unremarkable". He resigned in January 1905.

Later life
In retirement, Mosman pursued his interest in horse racing, owning a number of horses. His horse Balfour won the Queensland Turf Club Derby in 1902.

In the final months of his life, he was not in good health. However, on Saturday 13 November 1909, Mosman went to Eagle Farm Racecourse for the Derby race, but was forced to return home after the first race feeling ill. On the following Monday 15 November, he was at his residence Easton Gray, Soudan Street, Toowong, Brisbane, when he drank a glass of milk and died. He was buried in Toowong Cemetery on 16 November 1909.

He never married but was well-connected through his sisters Harriette (second wife of Queensland Premier Thomas McIlwraith) and Cecilia (wife of Queensland Premier Arthur Hunter Palmer). He and left over £70,000 to his relatives, much of it to his nephew Cecil Palmer.

Legacy
A street in Charters Towers was named after him.

Mosman Park, a suburb in Charters Towers, is named after him.

The Mossman River was named by the explorer George Dalrymple on 6 December 1873. Dalrymple wrote "I named this river the Mossman River, after Mossman, an explorer and mining man, member of a very prominent mining family". The town of Mossman takes its name from the river.

The house Easton Gray (home of the Palmer family) and its 18 acres of land was sold in 1944 to construct Toowong High School, now Queensland Academy for Science, Mathematics and Technology.

See also
 Contemporaries in the Queensland Legislative Council
 Members of the Queensland Legislative Council, 1890–1899
 Members of the Queensland Legislative Council, 1900–1909

References

Sources

1843 births
1909 deaths
Australian prospectors
Australian miners
Members of the Queensland Legislative Council
Australian amputees
Politicians from Sydney
Burials at Toowong Cemetery
19th-century Australian politicians
Mosman family
Businesspeople from Sydney